El juramento, is a Mexican telenovela directed by Guillermo Diazayas for Televisa in 1974. Starring Marga López and Jorge Martínez de Hoyos.

Cast 
Marga López
Jorge Martínez de Hoyos
Carmen Salas
Nubia Martí
Enrique Novi
Aarón Hernán
Socorro Avelar
Miguel Gómez Checa
Juan Peláez

References

External links 

Mexican telenovelas
1974 telenovelas
Televisa telenovelas
Spanish-language telenovelas
1974 Mexican television series debuts
1974 Mexican television series endings